Garad Jama Garad Ali (is the supreme traditional clan chief (Garad) of the Dhulbahante. On May 22, 2006 he was crowned in Las Anod in the presences of a large crowd, including high-ranking dignitaries from the Somali Government, Somali Region, Somaliland, and Puntland.

Garad Jama belongs to a dynastical line of succession that had a continuous hereditary nature for four centuries, except during the Darawiish period. Garad Jama is a vocal advocate for a united Somalia. He has continuously rejected Puntland's overtures or Somaliland's quest for independence. In numerous appearances, Garad Jama has called for the withdrawal of Puntland and Somaliland troops from the Dhulbahante inhabited regions of Sool, Sanaag and Cayn.

SSCD
The Garad Jama of Sool, Sanaag , Cayn & Doollo currently resides in the border town of Sahdheer.
 
While Garad Jama is supportive of Somali unity, his predecessor, Garad Abdiqani Garad Jama, who led the Dhulbahante delegation in the Grand Conference in Burao in 1991 was first to table the case for secession, and was one of several signatories of the Somaliland Declaration of Independence on behalf of the Dhulbahante. Nonetheless, Garad Abdiqani was never fully convinced of Somaliland's secessionist endeavour, and later retracted his support when he participated in the foundation of Puntland in 1998.

Since his coronation, the Garad is actively engaged in peace and reconciliation efforts in the northern Somali regions. He primarily participates and spearheads efforts to resolve conflicts in Somaliland, Puntland state of Somalia and the Somali Region of Ethiopia. The Garad also possess a huge political sway and plays an influential role in the social dynamics of the northern Somalis.

The Coronation

The coronation brought together, for the first time after the collapse of Somali Government in 1991, a large number of politically diverse politicians such as former Somali Prime Minister Ali Khalif Galaydh, the President and the Vice-President of Puntland.

It took place on May 22, 2006, in Geedo-Qarsay Valley, near Las Anod, where Garad Jama's father (Garad Ali aka Ali Garad jama),  his uncle (Garad Abdiqani Garad Jama), and his grandfather (Garad Jama) were crowned. The Las-Anoders showed their well-known hospitality to the thousands of guests who attended "the once of a lifetime" ceremony. The audiences were entertained with well-trained horses that were decorated by damasks and embroidery, which manifested the traditional craftsmen and women's hard work based on the rich Somali cultural heritage.

At 10 o'clock the milk was poured into the Garad. Milk is a symbol of peace and eternal prosperity; this act is true to the equilibrium of the virtues of the traditional culture.

Press outlets of varying degrees of conventionality have utilized the abbreviation SSCD (Sool, Sanaag, Cayn, Doollo) for Garad Jama.

See also
 Dhulbahante
Garad Abdiqani Garad Jama
 Garad Saleban Garad Mohamed
Farah Garad
Khaatumo

References

External links

Caleema-saarkii Garaadka by the famous Somali writer Axmed F. Cali Idaajaa, one of the notable figures who attended the coronation ceremony.
Laascaanood: Ray of Hope by Ubax Abdikariim (May 24, 2006)
Revisiting_Somali_Cultture_With_Garaad_Jaamac  by Faisal A Roble

Ethnic Somali people
Somali monarchs
Year of birth missing (living people)
Living people
People from Las Anod
21st-century Somalian people
Somali sultans
Dhulbahante